Tephritis cometa is a species of tephritid or fruit flies in the genus Tephritis of the family Tephritidae.

Distribution
United Kingdom, Scandinavia & West Siberia South to France, Middle East.

References

Tephritinae
Insects described in 1840
Diptera of Europe